The sixth series of British science fiction television programme Doctor Who was shown in two parts. The first seven episodes were broadcast from April to June 2011, beginning with "The Impossible Astronaut" and ending with mid-series finale "A Good Man Goes to War". The final six episodes aired from August to October, beginning with "Let's Kill Hitler" and ending with "The Wedding of River Song". The main series was preceded by "A Christmas Carol", the 2010 Christmas special. The series was led by head writer and executive producer Steven Moffat, alongside executive producers Beth Willis and Piers Wenger. Sanne Wohlenberg, Marcus Wilson, and Denise Paul served as producers. The series was the sixth to air following the programme's revival in 2005 after the classic era aired between 1963 and 1989, and is the thirty-second season overall.

The series stars Matt Smith as the eleventh incarnation of the Doctor, an alien Time Lord who travels through time and space in his TARDIS, a spacecraft whose exterior resembles a British police box. It also stars Karen Gillan and Arthur Darvill as his companions, newlyweds Amy Pond and Rory Williams. Alex Kingston also returns as River Song, a mysterious woman from the Doctor's future who is revealed throughout the series to be Amy and Rory's part-Time Lord daughter and the Doctor's wife. In addition to Song, the series continues story threads from the fifth series, most notably the Silence and the cause of the TARDIS exploding in "The Big Bang".

Episodes 

This series was the first to include a mid-season broadcast break since Season 18, with twelve weeks between the transmissions of "A Good Man Goes to War" and "Let's Kill Hitler".

Supplemental episodes 
Two three-minute mini-episodes titled "Space" and "Time", directed by Richard Senior, were released on 18 March 2011, filmed under the sixth series' production cycle as part of BBC One's Red Nose Day telethon for the charity Comic Relief. The episodes form a two-part story, set entirely within the TARDIS, starring Matt Smith as the Doctor, Karen Gillan as Amy Pond and Arthur Darvill as Rory Williams, and were written by the programme's head writer Steven Moffat.

Prequels
A number of short prequel videos were released online prior to selected episodes' airings.

Casting 

Matt Smith, Karen Gillan and Arthur Darvill continued their roles as the Doctor, Amy Pond, and Rory Williams. Darvill had appeared in the previous series in a recurring role in seven episodes, acting as a companion in six of them, but became a regular in this series, having had his "fingers crossed" that this would happen.

Alex Kingston returned as River Song. Although Kingston did not expect to return before the fifth series, Moffat always intended for River to return to the series. James Corden also reprised his role as Craig Owens from "The Lodger" in "Closing Time", and Simon Callow briefly reprised his role as Charles Dickens from the first series episode "The Unquiet Dead", as did Ian McNeice who briefly reprised his role as Winston Churchill from the fifth series episode "Victory of the Daleks". A young version of Amy was played by Gillan's eleven-year-old cousin, Caitlin Blackwood, in the episodes "Let's Kill Hitler" and "The God Complex". Gillan and Blackwood first met on the set of the fifth series, but, although Blackwood had to audition, Gillan recommended her for the role.

"A Christmas Carol" guest-starred Michael Gambon and Katherine Jenkins as Kazran Sardick and Abigail respectively. Guest stars of the main series included Michael Sheen (voice) as "House" in "The Doctor's Wife",  Imelda Staunton (voice) as "Interface" in "The Girl Who Waited", Suranne Jones as Idris in "The Doctor's Wife", David Walliams as Gibbis in "The God Complex", Hugh Bonneville and Lily Cole as Henry Avery and the "Siren" respectively in "The Curse of the Black Spot", Mark Sheppard as Canton in "The Impossible Astronaut" and "Day of the Moon", and Daniel Mays as Alex in "Night Terrors".

Production

Development 

The sixth series was commissioned in March 2010, before the fifth series aired. Neither Peter Bennett nor Tracie Simpson returned as producers, with Sanne Wohlenberg covering the role for "A Christmas Carol" and the first two episodes filmed for the main series ("The Doctor's Wife" and "Night Terrors"). Marcus Wilson produced every other episode except "Closing Time", where Denise Paul produces and Wilson is credited as "series producer". Production designer Edward Thomas was replaced by Michael Pickwoad. Lead writer and executive producer Steven Moffat stated that the purpose of the previous series was to "reassure" the audience that the show was the same, despite the many production changes. However, he wanted this series to be more of a "ghost train" and "worry" the audience. The series is much more serialised than previous ones; the arc-driven nature was inspired by positive reactions from fans when the Doctor from the fifth series finale "The Big Bang" appeared in the earlier episode "Flesh and Stone". Moffat decided to "rest" the Doctor's arch-enemies the Daleks for the series, as being the "most frequent" enemies of the show made them "the most reliably defeatable enemies in the universe".

The series continues to build the mystery of the Silence, which had been introduced in the fifth series. Moffat did not wish to end the arc in the previous series, as he felt it would be "more fun" to continue it. Moffat had planned the revelation about River Song "for a long time"; when creating Amy's character, he chose "Pond" for her last name to create a link. Moffat intended for the "answer to be as complicated as the question". Moffat informed Kingston of the secrets of her character at the end of the previous series and she was not allowed to tell anyone; Smith, Gillan, and Darvill were unaware of the identity of her character. Song's identity was kept in top secrecy; the script read at the read-through of "A Good Man Goes to War" had a false ending, and only a select few were issued the real script.

Writing 

Matthew Graham was not able to write an episode as he was slated to for the fifth series because he did not believe he would have enough time. Moffat then asked him to write the two-part episode "The Rebel Flesh"/"The Almost People". Neil Gaiman had written "The Doctor's Wife" for the previous series, but due to budget constraints it was replaced with "The Lodger". This necessitated changes to the script, including the addition of Rory as a companion. During the production process the order of the third, fourth and ninth episodes was changed. "The Curse of the Black Spot" was swapped with "Night Terrors" because Moffat felt that the second half of the series was too dark. This necessitated minor changes for the episodes to fit into the storyline, most notably in "Night Terrors".

Moffat wanted to start the series with a two-parter that had gravity and a wider scope in plot. He also aimed to make them some of the darkest episodes. In contrast, the following episode, "The Curse of the Black Spot", would allow the characters to "kick back and have some fun". Gaiman's episode was based around the TARDIS, and allowing the Doctor and the TARDIS to speak to each other. Graham's two-parter was intended to lead into "A Good Man Goes to War", the mid-series finale, but have a main plot about "avatars that rebel". Graham took Moffat's pitch and added many of his own aspects, such as the monastery setting and the Flesh. Then, in addition to revealing who River Song is, "A Good Man Goes to War" presented the situation of the Doctor, who was typically a pacifist, being provoked enough to assemble an army. Moffat described the ending as "game-changing cliffhanger" and split the series in two because such a climax could not be done at the end of a series, as it would be "too long before it came back".

The mid-series premiere, "Let's Kill Hitler", was intended to be the opposite of the "grim and dark" tone of the series premiere. Mark Gatiss wrote "Night Terrors" to be a scary episode, surprised that dolls had not been used in Doctor Who before. "The Girl Who Waited" is a "Doctor-lite" episode, an episode in which the actor playing the Doctor is not required for much of the shooting, which allowed Tom MacRae to explore Amy and Rory's characters and relationship. The concept of "The God Complex" was originally pitched by Toby Whithouse for the fifth series, but it was pushed back as Moffat felt that it was too similar to the stories in that series. The penultimate episode, "Closing Time", is a sequel to series five's "The Lodger" and allows the Doctor to have some fun while building up to the finale. Writer Gareth Roberts also wanted to bring back the Cybermen, as there were no other returning monsters in the series and he thought "there should be a sense of history about the Doctor's final battle to save Earth before he heads off to meet his death". The finale was described by Moffat as "a big roller coaster ride of Doctor Who madness" and concludes the Doctor's death arc, though it intentionally leaves some mysteries.

Music
Murray Gold composed the soundtrack to this series, with orchestration by Ben Foster.

Filming 
"Night Terrors" was the first episode of the series to be filmed in September 2010. It was mainly filmed on a council estate in Bristol,  with some scenes filmed in Dyrham Park. Production of "The Doctor's Wife" also occurred in September, with some in October. The two-part opening story was partially filmed in the United States, a first for the programme. This production was done in Utah in November 2010. The story was co-produced by BBC America, who provided extra money for filming in the States. "The Rebel Flesh" and "The Almost People" was filmed in late November 2010 to January 2011, with much location shooting at Caerphilly Castle. "The Curse of the Black Spot" was filmed in Cornwall as well as the Upper Boat Studios, while some of "A Good Man Goes to War" was filmed in a hangar in Cardiff and began shooting mid-January 2011. "The God Complex" was mostly filmed on constructed hotel sets, and the low-budget "The Girl Who Waited" was intentionally set in "big white boxes". "Closing Time" was filmed at night in a department store, as well as a private home in Cardiff, with some filming reports in March 2011. "Let's Kill Hitler" featured Swansea and Cardiff's Temple of Peace as locations in Berlin. Filming concluded on 29 April 2011 with "The Wedding of River Song", though a scene from "Let's Kill Hitler" was delayed and filmed on 11 July 2011.

Production blocks were arranged as follows:

Release

Promotion 
The first trailer for the sixth series was shown directly after "A Christmas Carol". In December 2010, BBC America began airing promotions for the new series with Smith and Gillan in character, announcing that they have landed in America. A 15-second teaser trailer was shown on BBC One at 9pm, 22 March 2011. This was followed by a one-minute trailer on 30 March 2011. BBC America followed with a one-minute trailer on 1 April. In addition, two radio trailers were broadcast in the UK in April.

On 10 June 2011, the BBC released a short 30-second teaser trailer for the second half of the series. Smith and Gillan, alongside executive producers Piers Wenger and Beth Willis and "The God Complex" writer Toby Whithouse, attended the 2011 San Diego Comic-Con International in late June to promote the second half of the series. There a one-minute trailer and a clip of "The God Complex" was shown. A 40-second trailer was released on 4 August 2011 for BBC One. A 30-second trailer from BBC America was released on 12 August 2011.  An alternative trailer aired on CBBC in August 2011.

In addition, the BBC released prequels on the Doctor Who official website to promote some of the episodes. The first, for "The Impossible Astronaut", was released on 25 March 2011. Prequels were subsequently released to promote "The Curse of the Black Spot", "A Good Man Goes to War", "Let's Kill Hitler", and "The Wedding of River Song".

Broadcast 
The series was split into two halves, primarily for storytelling reasons, with the first seven episodes airing in early 2011 and the final six airing later in the year. The first half aired in the United Kingdom on BBC One from 23 April 2011, and the second half from 27 August.

In the United States, the sixth series began airing on BBC America on 23 April; following "A Christmas Carol", this was the first full series to air on the same day in the US as the UK. However, "The Almost People" and "A Good Man Goes to War" were delayed by one week due to expected low numbers of TV viewers during the Memorial Day weekend. Space aired the premiere on 23 April for Canadian viewers, and "The Impossible Astronaut" was broadcast in Australia on ABC1 on 30 April. The series started screening in New Zealand on Prime on 19 May 2011. The second half of the series, beginning with "Let's Kill Hitler", was broadcast on 27 August 2011 on BBC America and on Space. ABC1 began the second run on 3 September.

Some international broadcasts, including BBC America, contained a special introductory narration by Amy explaining the concept of the series before the opening credits. Moffat was asked to write the sequence; he called it a "bloody good idea" because it would make it accessible to new audiences, despite noting that diehard fans would not like it. Previous showrunner Russell T Davies was also a fan of the sequence.

Home media 

All of the episodes from the first half of the series ("The Impossible Astronaut" to "A Good Man Goes to War") were released on 11 July 2011 on DVD and Blu-ray, entitled Doctor Who: Series Six, Part 1. This set included two featurettes called "Monster Files", which looked into the Silence and the Gangers. Doctor Who: Series Six, Part 2, covering episodes from "Let's Kill Hitler" to "The Wedding of River Song", was released on DVD and Blu-ray on 10 October 2011. It also contained two "Monster Files" on the Antibodies and the Cybermats. A 6-disc boxset containing all 13 episodes of the series and "A Christmas Carol" was released on 21 November 2011 in Region 2, 22 November in Region 1, on 1 December 2011 in Region 4. A limited edition box set was also released in the UK with a lifted image of a Silent on the cover and including five 3-D art cards. Special features included in the box sets are commentaries on five episodes, "Space" and "Time", the prequels, trailers, "Monster Files", and the cut-down versions of the accompanying Doctor Who Confidential episodes. Also included is Night and the Doctor, which comprises five made-for-DVD mini-episodes.

Reception

Ratings 
"A Christmas Carol" received final ratings of 12.11 million UK viewers, the fourth highest rated Christmas special behind "Voyage of the Damned", "The Next Doctor", and Part Two of "The End of Time". The ratings for the series dramatically increased once time-shifted viewers were taken into account.  "The Impossible Astronaut" premiered with a consolidated figure of 8.86 million viewers in the UK, and was reportedly the most recorded television event of all time. It also received 1.379 million requests on BBC's online iPlayer for the month of April. The series held a consistent viewership in the seven millions, with the lowest-rated episode being "The Almost People" with 6.72 million.

The series also received a strong Appreciation Index, with all episodes aside from "A Christmas Carol" in the "excellent" category of a score of 85 or more. While "The Impossible Astronaut" and "A Good Man Goes to War" reached 88, the finale only scored 86, compared to 88, 89, and 91 of the previous finales of the revived series.

In Canada on Space, "The Impossible Astronaut" was viewed by 538,000, the most-watched Doctor Who episode for the channel and its most-watched telecast thus far in 2011. On BBC America in the United States, "The Impossible Astronaut" was the channel's highest-rated telecast with 1.3 million viewers, increasing to 1.8 million when DVR recordings were taken into account. The second half of the series, with Top Gear and Luther, contributed to the third quarter of 2011 being BBC America's highest rated. Doctor Who also became the most-downloaded show of 2011 on iTunes in the US, with the sixth series specifically topping the chart.

Critical reception 
The review aggregation website Rotten Tomatoes gives the series a score of 100 percent, with a weighted average of 9.04 out of 10.

Reviewing the first half, Dave Golder of SFX praised the change in direction Moffat had taken with the show, calling it "more visually impressive and more narratively rewarding than anything we've had before". The Guardian Dan Martin was positive towards the first six episodes, despite calling "The Curse of the Black Spot" a "wasted opportunity" and noting that it would be a risk to serialise the story too much. He particularly praised the way Amy, Rory, and the Doctor had developed since the last series.

Sam McPherson of Zap2it said that, despite a few "duds", the sixth series was the "strongest" since Doctor Who revival in 2005. Despite disliking the finale as a conclusion, The Independent Neela Debnath praised the character development seen in the series as well as the "cinematic quality". She also was positive to the dynamic between the Doctor, Amy, and Rory, as it was different from other characters seen previously on the show, and continuing with the same character allowed the series to feel more "multi-layered". Charlie Jane Anders of io9 described it as "of the most unusual, and structurally ambitious, eras in Doctor Who history" and praised the way the story revolved around the Doctor. Anders commented in a review of the DVD release that the "inventiveness and cleverness" was an integral part of the sixth series, and the episodes such as "The Doctor's Wife" and "The God Complex" would be considered classics. She praised Moffat's writing, while commenting on the fact that the series' primary storylines, including Amy's pregnancy, River Song's childhood and assassination plot on the Doctor were not satisfying enough when re-watching the series. Anders did not consider Amy and River particularly "plausible characters". DVD Talk's John Sinnott gave the series four out of five stars, feeling that it "[didn't] quite hit the heights" of the fifth series but was "still pretty good (and light years past any other SF show currently in production)". Despite finding the solution "witty, unpredictable ... and very satisfying", he stated that the subplots were "a bit convoluted" and potentially confusing, and they "seem to drop the mystery of the person in the space suit for a large part of the season and [focus] on other odd events". He also noted that the plots of the consecutive episodes "Night Terrors", "The Girl Who Waited", and "The God Complex" were similar.

Reviewing the whole series, SFX Ian Berriman was more critical, giving it three and a half out of five stars. He criticised the story arc, finding it too complicated and the solution unsatisfying, and noted that it lacked "emotional impact". Anders felt that the story arc, especially the finale, suffered from Amy and River not being portrayed as believable characters. Digital Spy named Doctor Who the eighth best show of 2011, feeling that the series was "something of a mixed bag" with episodes of varying quality but generally praised the acting of the cast: "Matt Smith was firing on all cylinders – there's a confidence that comes with knowing you're a hit with viewers – while Arthur Darvill's Rory excelled in his first year as a series regular". Gavin Fuller of The Daily Telegraph wrote that "The Wedding of River Song" was "an uneven ending to a slightly uneven series which at times has been in danger of overcomplicating itself, but still has been one of the most creative and distinctive series on television". The series was also criticised by viewers and the press for being "too scary" for young children, "too complicated", and running the risk of alienating casual viewers. Arnold T. Blumburg of IGN stated that the sixth series "inspired seriously divided reactions in fandom" and, in his opinion, "the show has never been more unevenly written or emotionally distant".

Awards and nominations

Soundtrack 
Selected pieces of score from this series (from "The Impossible Astronaut" to "The Wedding of River Song"), as composed by Murray Gold, was released on 19 December 2011 by Silva Screen Records. The music from "A Christmas Carol" was released separately on its own soundtrack.

References

External links 

 
 
 

2011 British television seasons
Series 06
Series 06
 
Split television seasons